Albano Benjamín Bizzarri (born 9 November 1977) is an Argentine former professional footballer who played as a goalkeeper.

He spent the vast majority of his professional career in Spain and Italy, starting out at Real Madrid in 1999.

Club career

Spain
Born in Etruria, Córdoba of Italian descent, Bizzarri began his career with Racing Club de Avellaneda in the Argentine Primera División, where his good performances drew attention from La Liga powerhouse Real Madrid, which signed him in 1999. Unsettled and blocked by the emergence of 18-year-old Iker Casillas, he battled for second-choice status with Bodo Illgner, being a used player in the club's victorious campaign in the UEFA Champions League.

In the summer of 2000, Bizzarri was transferred to Real Valladolid, eventually becoming the starter. He did not miss one single league game from 2002 to 2004, but his team would be relegated from the top flight in the latter season.

Bizzarri played for Gimnàstic de Tarragona in 2006–07, in another campaign that ended in top-tier relegation.

Italy
In June 2007, Bizzarri signed a two-year deal with Italy's Calcio Catania, a contract that would be renewed at the end of the season for an equal period. During 2008–09, he became first-choice under new coach Walter Zenga, after spending most of his debut campaign as a reserve behind Ciro Polito. His performances were consistent as the Sicily side retained their league status, and the player's performances also allowed him to be part of Goal.com's weekly "Serie A Team of the Week" more than any other goalkeeper in the competition.

Despite some stellar performances, Bizzarri admitted towards the end of the season he would not be renewing his link with Catania. Following this announcement, coach Zenga opted to drop him to the bench so young Tomáš Košický could gain some experience.

Bizzarri joined fellow league club S.S. Lazio in June 2009, on a free transfer. In his first two years, he backed up another South American, Uruguayan Fernando Muslera, as the Rome team ranked 12th in the first (he added four appearances in the UEFA Europa League, winning two, losing two and conceding seven goals).

The 36-year-old Bizzarri moved to A.C. ChievoVerona in summer 2014, renewing his contract for two years at the end of the season. On 1 July 2016, he signed a one-year deal with Delfino Pescara 1936, which included an automatic one-year renewal in the case of top-division survival.

On 16 July 2018, after a further campaign in the main division with Udinese Calcio, Bizzarri joined Serie B club Foggia Calcio. In the following transfer window, he was loaned to A.C. Perugia Calcio also of the latter tier until 30 June.

International career
Although he never earned a cap for Argentina, Bizzarri was part of the nation's final squad at the 1999 Copa América.

Career statistics

Honours
Real Madrid
UEFA Champions League: 1999–2000

Lazio
Supercoppa Italiana: 2009
Coppa Italia: 2012–13

References

External links

1977 births
Living people
Sportspeople from Córdoba Province, Argentina
Argentine people of Italian descent
Argentine footballers
Association football goalkeepers
Argentine Primera División players
Racing Club de Avellaneda footballers
La Liga players
Segunda División players
Real Madrid CF players
Real Valladolid players
Gimnàstic de Tarragona footballers
Serie A players
Serie B players
Catania S.S.D. players
S.S. Lazio players
Genoa C.F.C. players
A.C. ChievoVerona players
Delfino Pescara 1936 players
Udinese Calcio players
Calcio Foggia 1920 players
A.C. Perugia Calcio players
UEFA Champions League winning players
1999 Copa América players
Argentine expatriate footballers
Expatriate footballers in Spain
Expatriate footballers in Italy
Argentine expatriate sportspeople in Spain
Argentine expatriate sportspeople in Italy